The thirteenth floor is a designation of a level of a multi-level building that is often omitted in countries where the number  is considered unlucky. Omitting the 13th floor may take a variety of forms; the most common include denoting what would otherwise be considered the thirteenth floor as level 14, giving the thirteenth floor an alternate designation such as "12A" or "M" (the thirteenth letter of the Latin alphabet), or closing the 13th floor to public occupancy or access (e.g., by designating it as a mechanical floor).

Reasons for omitting a thirteenth floor include triskaidekaphobia on the part of the building's owner or builder, or a desire by the building owner or landlord to prevent problems that may arise with superstitious tenants, occupants, or customers. In 2002, based on an internal review of records, Dilip Rangnekar of Otis Elevators estimated that 85% of the buildings with Otis brand elevators did not have a floor named the 13th floor. Early tall-building designers, fearing a fire on the 13th floor, or fearing tenants' superstitions about the rumor, decided to omit having a 13th floor listed on their elevator numbering. This practice became commonplace, and eventually found its way into American mainstream culture and building design.

Vancouver city planners have banned the practice of skipping 4s and 13s, since it could lead to mistakes by first responders, for example going to the wrong floor.

Origin
The origin of skipping the thirteenth floor when installing elevators is not known. However, during the advent of early skyscrapers, New York architectural critics warned developers not to exceed the height of the 13th floor. These critics insisted that buildings rising above the 13th floor would lead to increased street congestion, ominous shadows and lower property values. Nevertheless, in a work published in 1939, sociologist Otto Neurath compared the use of money in an economy, which he saw as unnecessary, to the superstition of not installing the thirteenth floor: merely a social convention.

Methods

Skipped
Most commonly, 13 is skipped, as in: 12, 14, 15... The floor labeled "14" on the elevator is the thirteenth floor and the number 13 is skipped on the elevator console.

12A, 12B, 14A, and 14B
Sometimes to keep numbers consistent the 13th floor is simply renumbered as 12A or 12B, as in: 12, 12A, 14.., or 12, 12B, 14; this does not affect the numbers of the higher floors. Likewise, 14 could be used for the 13th floor and 14A or 14B could be used for the 14th floor.

Special designations
Other buildings will often use names for certain floors to avoid giving a floor on the building the number 13 designation. One such example is the Radisson Hotel in Winnipeg, Manitoba, where the 13th floor is called the pool floor. Another example is the Sheraton on the Falls in Niagara Falls, Ontario, where the 13th floor consists solely of a restaurant. A third example is the Trump International Hotel and Tower Chicago in Chicago, Illinois, where the 13th floor is the mezzanine floor.

Uninhabited 13th floor
Sometimes, the floor is put to some other use, such as a mechanical floor. Such usage is sometimes the subject of conspiracy theories (see below).

Letter M
In Richmond, Virginia, the Monroe Park Towers has a 13th floor, but it is used for mechanical equipment and is only accessible from the freight elevator or the stairs. The M designation on the elevator buttons of the freight elevator can also be construed as meaning the Mechanical level in this particular building, or as a Mezzanine level.

Split-level apartments
Sometimes, a tenement block will contain split-level apartments where the units themselves contain internal staircases and the main elevators for the building therefore do not stop on every floor. One example is Princess Towers in Kingston, Ontario, which has  stories excluding the roof-top. The elevators stop at B (basement), G (ground), 3, 6, 9, 12 and 15th floors only. In this case, the unmarked 11th and 13th floors are accessed within units on the marked 12th floor.

Research

In a 2007 Gallup poll, 13 percent of American adults reported that they would be bothered if given a hotel room on the thirteenth floor, while 9 percent indicated that they would be sufficiently bothered to request a room on a different floor.  Research on thirteenth-floor effects on real estate values presents a mixed picture.  Several prominent American real estate developers have claimed that they are unaware of any reduction in the value of thirteenth-floor offices or apartments.  On the other hand, in a study conducted in Russia, Burakov found that thirteenth-floor apartments were less likely to sell than were apartments on twelfth or fourteenth floors. This effect, however, was eliminated if developers offered buyers a 10% or greater discount on the cost of thirteenth-floor apartments.

Variant

Similarly, new buildings in some parts of China avoid the fourth, fourteenth, twenty-fourth, etc. floors, as the word "four" (Hanzi: 四) sounds like "death" (死 – pronounced "sì" and "sǐ", respectively) in Mandarin, the predominant language for the country, and most other varieties of Chinese. A small number of buildings also follow the American tradition of omitting the thirteenth floor, with the fifteenth floor immediately following the twelfth. Another variant found in Vietnam is naming floors 13 and 14 as floors "12A" and "12B" respectively.

In South Korea, buildings tend to include the fourth floor in spite of similar pronunciation issues in the Korean language, though some newer buildings may substitute the letter F in the place of the number 4.

Thirteenth room
In some buildings, 13 is also skipped as a room number. The 13-room (as of 1946) Boots Court Motel on U.S. Route 66 is one example; its rooms are numbered 1, 2, 3, 4, 5, 6, 7, 8, 9, 10, 11, 12 and 14.

In popular culture

Some conspiracy theorists have suggested that the thirteenth floor in government buildings is not really missing, but actually contains top-secret governmental departments, or more generally that it is proof of something sinister or clandestine going on. This implication is often carried over, implicitly or explicitly, into popular culture; for example in:
 The films The Thirteenth Floor, Nightmare on the 13th Floor, and 1408.
 The hidden research and development labs of Network 23 in the television program Max Headroom.
 The top-secret research and development division of The Hitchhiker's Guide to the Galaxy in the fifth book of the series, Mostly Harmless.
 The computer game Floor 13 by Virgin Interactive.
 The sci-fi comedy Red Dwarf where "floor 13" referred to a secret brig which was several decks high.
 The book Company by Max Barry.
 The Superman story in Action Comics #448 (June 1975) featured a secret thirteenth floor used to teleport alien tourists from another planet to visit Earth.
 The "Night of Owls" storyline in Batman features the thirteenth floors of Gotham's buildings being used as bases by the assassins of a secret society that has ruled Gotham for generations.
 The level "The 13th Floor" in the computer game Tomb Raider Chronicles.
 The episode "Grey 17 Is Missing" of the TV series Babylon 5 has a similar theme of a "missing" floor number actually containing a hidden floor with dark secrets.
 The psychedelic rock band The 13th Floor Elevators.
 The Rockford Files episode "Sticks and Stones May Break Your Bones, But Waterbury Will Bury You".
 The TV series Warehouse 13 that housed the wonders of the world and did not exist on any map.
 The first-season episode "Ghost In The Machine" of the TV series The X-Files features a scene where the Central Operating System reads aloud each distinct level, omitting the thirteenth floor as the elevator ascends.
 In the Marvel Comics event storyline Iron Man 2020, an army of rebel robots and artificial intelligences have a safe haven in the form of an extra-dimensional plane of existence made of solid light called the Thirteenth Floor that can be reached through any elevator in Manhattan, and access to it manifests in the form of a button for the thirteen floor that only cyber beings can see that appears off to the side of a regular floor button panel.
 In the film No Country For Old Men Carson Wells (Woody Harrelson) mentions to Man who hires Wells (Stephen Root) that one floor in a building seems to be missing.

See also
Storey

References

Building
Floors
Superstitions
Triskaidekaphobia
Urban legends